Pseudoseioptera ingrica is a species of ulidiid or picture-winged fly in the genus Pseudoseioptera of the family Ulidiidae.

References

Ulidiinae